Kidz in the Hall is an American hip hop duo from Chicago, Illinois.

History
Group members Jabari Evans (Naledge) and Michael Aguilar (Double-0) met in 2000 during a talent show at the University of Pennsylvania. They began recording songs, making demos, and performing at local shows which eventually led to Double-0 and Naledge forming Kidz in the Hall. Double-0 made a connection with Just Blaze through a job he had at T-Mobile. Blaze then aligned himself with the duo and oversaw their debut School Was My Hustle. Kidz in the Hall signed a group deal with Rawkus Records, and released the album in 2006.

In early 2007, Kidz in the Hall created a song entitled "Work To Do It" in support of democratic presidential nominee Barack Obama, who has ties to Naledge's hometown of Chicago. They were among the first artists to support Obama in their music. The song features a sample from The Main Ingredient's version of the Isley Brothers original of the same name.

In November 2007, Kidz in the Hall were officially signed to Duck Down Records, an independent label started by founding members of the Boot Camp Clik. The duo's second album, The In Crowd, was released in May 2008, with the lead single "Drivin' Down the Block," which samples Masta Ace's song "Born to Roll" for the hook and contains an interpolation of Outkast's "Elevators (Me & You)" on the bridge. This song was featured on the game Midnight Club Los Angeles: Complete Edition from Rockstar Games. Many other tracks on the album use samples and interpolations of early 1990s hip hop, including their song "Snob Hop" featuring Camp Lo which uses the hook from Black Sheep's song "Flava of the Month" for the chorus. Their song "Blackout" was featured on the soundtrack of Madden '09. The group's most recent album Land of Make Believe was released on March 9, 2010 and features guests MC Lyte, Just Blaze, Chip tha Ripper, Donnis, Amanda Diva and co-production by Just Blaze and Picnic Tyme. The album was declared the most "commercially viable" album the group has made thus far and was well-received critically, receiving an XL rating in XXL Magazine.

Naledge is also planning to come out with a solo album in the near future. He was quoted by rap website Hiphopdx, "My solo album is still in the process of being put together. I’ve been busy with shows, but I have some tracks in the works," says the rising MC. "I got beats from 9th Wonder, Black Milk, Double-O, Pete Rock and [two or three from] Just Blaze. Just Blaze has been my 'yes man', okaying tracks for the album."

Discography
Studio albums
School Was My Hustle (2006), Rawkus Records
The In Crowd (2008), Duck Down Records
Land of Make Believe (2010), Duck Down Records
Occasion (2011), Duck Down Records
Free Nights & Weekends (2017)

Extended plays
Wishful Drinking (2013)

Mixtapes
Detention (2007), Major League Entertainment
Geniuses Need Love Too (2008)
"The Professional Leisure Tour" (2009) LRG 
"Semester Abroad" (2011)

Singles
Wheelz Fall Off ('06 'Til...) (2006), Rawkus Records
Drivin' Down the Block (2008), Duck Down Records
Love Hangover (2008)
Take Over The World ft Colin Munroe and Just Blaze (2010)
Jukebox (2010)
Pour it Up (2011)

Music videos
"Wheelz Fall Off ('06 Til...)" (2006)
"Drivin' Down The Block" (2008)
"Love Hangover (feat. Estelle)" (2008)
"I Got It Made (Reebok Classic)" (2009)
"Jukebox" (2010)
"Break It Down" (2011)
"Occasion" (2011)
"Pour it Up" (2012)

References

Sources
"Jukebox" Land Of Make Believe (2010)

American hip hop groups
Musical groups from Chicago
American musical duos
Hip hop duos
Midwest hip hop groups